Identisick is the fourth studio album by French death metal band Benighted. It was released by Adipocère Records on February 10, 2006.

Track listing

Personnel 
Julien Truchand – vocals
Liem N'Guyen – guitar
Olivier Gabriel – guitar
Eric Lombard - bass
Fred Fayolle – drums

Guest musicians 
Leif Jensen (Dew Scented) - vocals

References

2004 albums
Benighted albums